Justesen is a surname. Notable people with the surname include:

Kirsten Justesen (born 1943), Danish artist
Mads Justesen (born 1982), Danish footballer
Michael Justesen (born 1950), American activist
Ole Justesen (born 1946), Danish sport shooter

See also
Justesen code